Daryl Frederick Schimmelbusch (born 30 December 1954) is a former Australian rules footballer who played with North Melbourne in the VFL. He is the younger brother of Wayne Schimmelbusch.

Schimmelbusch made his debut for North Melbourne in 1978 after playing in the reserves the previous season where he won the Gardiner Medal. He played 47 games over 4 seasons with the Kangaroos.

In 1982 he joined West Torrens in the SANFL. He earned South Australian interstate selection in 1984 He finished his career at West Torrens in 1985.

External links

1954 births
Living people
Australian rules footballers from Victoria (Australia)
North Melbourne Football Club players
West Torrens Football Club players
Woodville Football Club players
Brunswick Football Club players
South Australian State of Origin players